Paulo Ricardo Ferreira (born 13 June 1994), known as  Paulo Ricardo, is a Brazilian professional footballer who plays for Saudi Arabian club Al-Hazem. Mainly a central defender, he can also play as a defensive midfielder.

Club career
Born in Laguna, Santa Catarina, Paulo Ricardo joined Santos' youth system in 2012, aged 18, after stints with Atlético Catarinense, Brusque and Figueirense. At the latter he also suffered with recurrent back injuries which included a vertebral fracture.

On 21 March 2014 Paulo Ricardo signed a new deal with Peixe, running until 2017. He made his first team debut on 18 July, coming on as a late substitute in a 2–0 home success against Palmeiras for the Campeonato Brasileiro Série A championship.

On 26 April 2015, after Werley's illness and Gustavo Henrique's injury, Paulo Ricardo was made a starter in 2015 Campeonato Paulista final against Palmeiras, but was sent off after committing a penalty in a 1–0 away loss. He appeared more regularly with the club during the campaign, being sometimes utilized as a defensive midfielder by manager Dorival Júnior.

On 7 July 2016, Paulo Ricardo was loaned to FC Sion for one year. He made his debut for the club on 10 August, starting in a 3–1 away loss against FC Lugano.

On 24 July 2017, Paulo Ricardo joined Sion permanently, with Santos receiving a compensation fee. On 8 August of the following year, he returned to his homeland after agreeing to a one-year loan deal with Fluminense. In the summer of 2021, he moved to the Finnish club KuPS.

On 22 January 2023, Ricardo joined Saudi club Al-Hazem.

Career statistics

Honours
Santos
Campeonato Paulista: 2015
Individual
Veikkausliiga Defender of the Year: 2022
Veikkausliiga Team of the Year: 2022

References

External links
 Santos FC profile 
 

1994 births
Living people
Sportspeople from Santa Catarina (state)
Brazilian footballers
Association football defenders
Campeonato Brasileiro Série A players
Campeonato Brasileiro Série B players
Santos FC players
Fluminense FC players
Goiás Esporte Clube players
Figueirense FC players
Swiss Super League players
Swiss Promotion League players
Veikkausliiga players
FC Sion players
Kuopion Palloseura players
Saudi First Division League players
Al-Hazem F.C. players
Brazilian expatriate footballers
Brazilian expatriate sportspeople in Switzerland
Expatriate footballers in Switzerland
Brazilian expatriate sportspeople in Finland
Expatriate footballers in Finland
Brazilian expatriate sportspeople in Saudi Arabia
Expatriate footballers in Saudi Arabia